St. Evtimiy Crag (Sv. Evtimiev Kamak \sve-'ti ev-'ti-mi-ev 'ka-m&k\) is a rocky peak of elevation 350 m in Delchev Ridge, Tangra Mountains, Livingston Island in the South Shetland Islands, Antarctica surmounting Dobrudzha Glacier to the southwest, Ropotamo Glacier to the northeast and Yantra Cove to the east.

The feature is named after the Bulgarian scholar and spiritual leader St. Euthymius of Turnovo (1327–1404).

Location

Maps
 L.L. Ivanov et al. Antarctica: Livingston Island and Greenwich Island, South Shetland Islands. Scale 1:100000 topographic map. Sofia: Antarctic Place-names Commission of Bulgaria, 2005.
 L.L. Ivanov. Antarctica: Livingston Island and Greenwich, Robert, Snow and Smith Islands. Scale 1:120000 topographic map.  Troyan: Manfred Wörner Foundation, 2009.

References
 St. Evtimiy Crag. SCAR Composite Antarctic Gazetteer
 Bulgarian Antarctic Gazetteer. Antarctic Place-names Commission. (details in Bulgarian, basic data in English)

External links
 St. Evtimiy Crag. Copernix satellite image

Tangra Mountains